Service Civil International (SCI) is an international peace organisation. Since 1920, it organises international volunteering projects in the form of workcamps and it was the first organisation worldwide to do so. The organisation was founded by Swiss pacifist Pierre Cérésole in the aftermath of World War I in order to foster understanding and a culture of peace between people from different countries.

Aims

SCI states to base its work on the following values: 
Volunteering – in the sense of acting out of self-initiative, without seeking material reward and for the benefit of civil society, as a method and a statement for social change, whilst never competing with paid labour nor seeking to contribute to strike-breaking
Non-violence – as a principle and a method
Human Rights – respect for individuals as stated in the Universal Declaration of Human Rights
Solidarity – international solidarity for a more just world and solidarity between human beings at all levels
Respect for the Environment – and the ecosystem of which we are a part and upon which we are dependent
Inclusion – to be open and inclusive to all individuals who share the aims and objectives of the movement, without regard to gender, race, colour, religion, nationality, social status or political views and any other possible grounds for discrimination
Empowerment – empowering people to understand and act to transform the social, cultural and economic structures that affect their lives at all levels
Co-operation – with local communities as well as other local, national and international stakeholders to strengthen the positive potential within civil society as a whole.
SCI believes that all people are capable of living together with mutual respect and without recourse to any form of violence to solve conflicts. It organises international volunteer projects all over the world because it believes that peace can only be built if people with different backgrounds and cultures learn to co-operate and work together.

Activities 
The organisation organises international voluntary services. Most of the projects that SCI organises are short-term projects between one and three weeks for groups of international volunteers. In 2019, SCI organised 270 such workcamps and 1897 volunteers participated in them. In addition, SCI sends volunteers to workcamps organised by partner organisations. Most volunteers are youth between the age of 18 and 25 and more than half of all participants are school or university students.

In long-term voluntary services, international volunteers stay for a longer period in another country. In 2019, 371 volunteers participated in long-term volunteering or special programmes. Many long-term voluntary services within Europe are funded by the European Commission through the European Solidarity Corps programme.

History

Beginnings after World War I 
Swiss pacifist Pierre Cérésole took part in the peace conference Bilthoven Conference, organised by the Fellowship of Reconciliation in 1920 in Bilthoven. There he gained approval among other Christian pacifists, many of them Quakers, for the idea to initiate "international civil services" both as a post-war reconciliation method for people from countries that had just fought in the war against each other as well as an alternative to military service.
Cérésole organised the first international volunteering camp as a "Service Civil" (civil service) on the former battle field of Verdun in France in 1920. International volunteers from around Europe were engaged in the project in order to reconstruct the war-damaged village Esnes-en-Argonne. The project was supposed to be a symbol of reconciliation between France and Germany; among the group of international volunteers were also three German volunteers. Volunteers built temporary homes for the villagers and cleared the farm land.

In the following years, several workcamps were organised to provide disaster relief after natural catastrophes. In 1924, Cérésole organised the second international workcamp in Les Ormonts (Switzerland), which helped to clear rubble after an avalanche. Here, the name "Service Civil International" was used for the first time. The largest disaster relief camp of the early history of the organisation took place in 1928 in Liechtenstein with more than 700 volunteers from 28 countries over a course of several months. Volunteers cleared the Rhine valley plain after a heavy flood in 1927.

In 1924, Cérésole also started to promote international workcamps as a model service for conscientious objectors, in order to support a political campaign to introduce an alternative service in Switzerland.

Evolution of the idea workcamp

From 1931 on, the SCI idea evolved and the concept of workcamps with international volunteers were applied in other areas of social commitment During the economic crisis of the coal mining industry in Wales, a workcamp was organised to restore self-confidence in distressed mining town of Brynmawr (Wales, Great Britain). Volunteers and unemployed men build a swimming pool and layout a public park.

Cérésole, who was inspired by Gandhi's philosophy of non-violence and who had met Gandhi in 1931, wanted to spread the idea of workcamps to India. Through the support of British Quakers and friends of Gandhi, among them Charles Freer Andrews, he could set up the first workcamp in India in 1934 to do disaster relief work in the Bihar region, affected by the 1934 Nepal–Bihar earthquake. The project had only four European participants and the concept of organising workcamps as international reconciliation proved difficult to translate to a colonial context, where white Europeans would be identified with the colonizing power. However, the project was well received as creating a new image of how Europeans could interact with Indians by, among others, Rajendra Prasad, who later became the President of India.

In 1937, SCI was mandated by a group of aid organizations  to give humanitarian help for refugee children during the Spanish Civil War. Under the name Ayuda Suiza and coordinated by SCI activist Rodolfo Olgiati, Swiss SCI volunteers such as Elisabeth Eidenbenz, Ralph Hegnauer und Idy Hegnauer carried out evacuation services and food and clothing distribution in parts of the Spanish Republic. Twenty years later, humanitarian help was given to war orphans in Tunisia during the Algerian War (1958–1962). Besides those two projects, humanitarian help never got any further importance in SCI.

Establishment of the organisation

Since 1920, SCI organised workcamps and activities with no formal structure in France, Switzerland, Great Britain, India, and other countries. Only in 1934, SCI was registered as an organisation for the first time in Switzerland. As the idea of workcamps expanded to other countries after World War II, an international association of SCI branches with an international secretariat in Paris was founded in 1948. The placement of volunteers was professionalized, e.g. by setting up a volunteer insurance. The number of workcamps and volunteers increased a lot:
 1947: 46 workcamps in 9 countries
 1968: 298 workcamps in 24 countries.
The number branches increased similarly. In the 1960s, regional coordination structures for Africa, Asia and Europa were set up. The first branch in Asia was the Indian branch, which was registered in 1956. After the first attempt to spread the idea of workcamps to India in 1934, from 1949 on, Swiss SCI volunteers began with refugee relief work in settlements in Faridabad. Long-term volunteers from Europe, mainly Switzerland and the UK, were sent to India in the 1950s and in the 60s to Malaysia, and some Indian and Pakistani volunteers participated in European workcamps. 

In the 1950s, SCI started to set up development aid program and to recruit qualified volunteers for these. The largest development programme was in the province of Tlemcen, West Algeria, after the Algerian Independence War (1954–1962). Simone Tanner Chaumet and Mohamed Sahnoun for example worked in Algeria as SCI volunteers. From 1962 till 1968, SCI rebuilt the village Beni Hamou, set up a medical service and community development like primary teaching for the district of Sebdou.

Cold War
During the Cold War, SCI organised activities where people from both sides of the Iron Curtain could meet. It was one of the most active and most important organisations in to organise and promote east–west workcamps.

SCI volunteers from Western Europe took part in a workcamp during the 5th World Youth Festival in Warsaw (Poland) in 1955. Workcamps were co-organised with a socialist volunteer organisation in Poland (1955), the GDR (1956), USSR (1958), Hungary (1964), Czechoslovakia (1964), and Bulgaria (1981). These contacts were intensified in the 1970s.

Volunteers from Eastern Europe could also participate in workcamps in the West. 166 Czechoslovak volunteers took part in projects that the British branch of SCI organised during the Cold War.

While it was not possible to found SCI chapters in socialist countries, in 1972, SCI set up an east–west commission in order to facilitate volunteer exchange and to improve co-operation with partner organisations in the Eastern Bloc. With the political shift in Eastern Europe, new SCI branches were founded in former socialist countries after 1990.

Reorientation (1969)
In a row of seminars, workshops and meetings from 1969 on, the political implication of SCI in society were reviewed. As consequence SCI abandon the developmental aid approach as one of the main purpose of workcamps. The social and political awareness rising for and through international volunteers got focus in most activities of SCI. In particular the North-South reorientate to the concept of development education and solidarity. Examples several international campaigns (1985–1992) for the independence of Namibia were organised, which was followed by an international refugee campaign (1994–1997).

The reorientation lead to further standardisation in international volunteer exchange. In the late 1970s, a decentralised volunteer placement system for workcamps was introduced, while the north–south and east–west exchange were centralised by European and International Co-ordination of SCI. The latter was decentralised in the mid 90s.

International working groups (1997)
With the reorientation in the 1970s, SCI converted its structure with international and regional secretariats to and international coordination with working groups with focus on a particular region or interest area. In 1997 major constitutional change introduced a status for working groups, which are approved now every year. Regional working groups exists for Africa, Asia (AIWG)and Latin America (Aba Yala) and South Eastern Europe (SAVA). The other working groups focused on the following topics:
 Immigration and refugee (since 1970) such as the European Centre for Immigration
 East-West exchange (since 1972) such as the Group of Action together in Europe (GATE)
 Gender issue (since 1983) such as the WIN
 Conscientious Objection (1984–1990)
 Youth and Unemployment (since 1985) YUWG
 North-South Exchange (since 1987): such as the SEED
 Long Term Volunteering (since 1989): such as the LTRC
 Environmental issues (since 1998)
 Human Rights (since 1998)
 BEES (Better Evaluations and Exchange Support) – quality of volunteer exchanges

List of SCI branches and groups
SCI divides between full member with branches-status and associated members with group-status. The international committee of SCI decides about the status based on the national constitution, organisation and infrastructure of its members. The national branches can have their own names, which they state "branch of SCI" in their documents. The following tables give an overview on all branches, groups, and partner organisations of SCI.

Networking

The organisation has consultative status with the Council of Europe, operational relations with UNESCO and is a member of: 
CCIVS (Coordinating Committee of International Voluntary Service Organisations) 
YFJ (Youth Forum Jeunesse)
UNITED for Intercultural Action – a European network against nationalism, racism, fascism

In 1987, SCI was awarded the title of Messenger of Peace given by the United Nations, in acknowledgement of its efforts to promote peace and understanding.

Full members status is held to the European Youth Forum (YFJ) which operates within the Council of Europe and European Union areas and works closely with both these bodies.

Prominent members 

 Pierre Cérésole
 Hélène Monastier
 Rodolfo Olgiati
 Mohamed Sahnoun
 Friedrich Glasl
 Simone Tanner-Chaumet
 Elisabeth Eidenbenz
 Jens Klocksin
 Max-Henri Béguin
 Emma Ott
 August Bohny
 Idy Hegnauer
 Ralph Hegnauer

SCI International Archives 

The international archives of the worldwide organisation provides documentation on volunteering for peace since 1920. The archives are in the town library of La Chaux-de-Fonds (Switzerland) and were founded by Ralph Hegnauer in 1975. The files, documents and photos in more than 700 archive boxes are public accessible via several inventories and databases. A part of the material is available online.

Bibliography
Ethelwyn Best, Bernhard Pike: International Voluntary Service for Peace 1920–1946, George Allen and Unwin, London, 1948
Arthur Gillette : One million volunteers: the story of volunteer youth service, Penguin Books, Harmondsworth, A pelican original, 1968, 258 p. on-line
 Hélène Monastier, Alice Brügger: Paix, pelle et pioche, Histoire du Service Civil International, Editions du Service civil international, Switzerland, 1966
SCI : Service Civil International 1920–1990 – 70 years of Voluntary Service for Peace and Reconciliation, Verdun, 1990

Notes

External links

SCI official website
SCI Peace related website
International Archives of SCI
SCI official workcamps database

International organisations based in Belgium
International nongovernmental organizations
International volunteer organizations
Organizations established in 1920